Rahul Madhav (born 29 December 1984) is an Indian actor who mainly appears in Malayalam cinema. He has also acted in Tamil and Kannada films. His notable films are Vaadamalli, Thani Oruvan, Memories and 100 Days of Love.

Acting career
Rahul Madhav made his debut in the industry with the Tamil movie Adhe Neram Adhe Idam, directed by M. Prabhu, who was the associate director of S. J. Surya. Later, he got an offer from the Tamil industry to play the lead role in Yugam (2012), directed by Sribavansekar, during the shooting of this movie he got an offer from Mollywood to present one of the lead characters in Bangkok Summer (2011), which was directed by Pramod Pappan.

However, it was his next film, Vaadamalli (2011), where he plays a student who comes from the slums and his people from the slums sponsor his education, that gave him recognition. Later Rahul and Richa Panai were paired for the third time in a film which failed to take off.

Rahul got a breakthrough in his acting career after presenting the lead role in the Malayalam movie Lisammayude Veedu, directed by Babu Janardhanan, which was released in 2013. He presented the character Sivankutty while Meera Jasmine played the opposite to him. His performance was noticed by many film personalities. It was actor Prithviraj who suggested to Jeethu for him to play a supporting character in the thriller movie Memories. Later, he had appeared in many Malayalam and Tamil films. His role in Thani Oruvan was well received.

Rahul made his debut in Kannada with the movie Kiragorina Gayyaligalu, directed by D. Sumana Kittur, which was released in 2016.

In 2017, he had six releases in Malayalam and one release in Kannada, he also signed his first film in Tulu, titled Kudla Connection.

Filmography

 All films are in Malayalam language unless otherwise noted.

References

External links
 

Indian male film actors
Living people
Male actors from Kozhikode
Male actors in Malayalam cinema
21st-century Indian male actors
Male actors in Tamil cinema
1986 births